Louis-Marin Henriquez (1765 – 1815) was an 18th-century French writer and playwright.

A professor of belles-lettres at the college of Blois, he wrote polemical articles in the Mercure de France and Épitres et évangiles du républicain, his most popular work.

Works 
1790: Je m'en fouts: liberté, libertas, foutre!
1791: Le Pape traité comme il le mérite, ou Réponse à la bulle de Pie V
1791: Le Diable à confesse
1793: Les Aventures de Jérôme Lecocq, ou les vices du despotisme et les avantages de la liberté
1794: Histoires et morales choisies, pour chaque mois de l'année républicaine, ouvrage destiné à l'instruction de la jeunesse
1794: Morale républicaine en conseils et en exemples, pour toutes les décades de l'année, à l'usage des jeunes sans-culottes
1794: Pensées républicaines pour chaque jour du mois
1795: Principes de civilité républicaine, dédiés à l'enfance et à la jeunesse
1798: Le Chaudronnier de Saint-Flour, comedy in one act, with Armand Gouffé
1798: Voyage et aventures de Frondeabus, fils d'Herschell, dans la cinquième partie du monde, ouvrage traduit de la langue herschellique
1798: Épîtres et évangiles du républicain pour toutes les décades de l'année, à l'usage des jeunes sans-culottes
1804: Les Grâces à confesse, poem in four chants, 1804
undated: La Dépanthéonisation de J.-P. Marat, patron des hommes de sang et des terroristes (20 pluviôse), fondée sur ses crimes et sur les forfaits des jacobins

Bibliography 
 Louis Gabriel Michaud, Biographie universelle ancienne et moderne, vol.9, 1845, 
 Camille Dreyfus, André Berthelot, La Grande encyclopédie: inventaire raisonné des sciences, des lettres et des arts, vol.19, 1886,
 Gilbert Py, Rousseau et les éducateurs, 1997,

References 

18th-century French writers
18th-century French male writers
19th-century French writers
18th-century French dramatists and playwrights
1765 births
1815 deaths